Coenonympha thyrsis is a small butterfly found in the  Palearctic that belongs to the browns family. It is endemic to Crete.

Description from Seitz

C. thyrsis Fn-. (48 e). Nearest to the preceding [C. vaucheri] , but the apical ocellus not particularly large; the 5 dots at the distal margin of the hindwing very minute. On the underside much less variegated and contrasting than vaucheri ; the apex of the cell not white; the dirty white distal portion of the hindwing reduced to a pale band on account of the distal margin being broadly dark. — In Candia, in May and June.

See also
List of butterflies of Europe

References

Satyrinae
Butterflies described in 1845